The Huta Pieniacka massacre was a massacre of the Polish inhabitants of the village Huta Pieniacka, located in modern-day Ukraine, which took place on February 28, 1944. Estimates of the number of victims range from 500, to 1,200.

Polish and Ukrainian historians disagree over the responsibility for the Huta Pienacka massacre. According to the Polish Institute of National Remembrance, the action was committed by the 14th subunit of the 14th SS Volunteer Division "Galizien" of the Waffen-SS. Polish witnesses testified that the orders were given by German officers. According to witness accounts and scholarly publications, SS Galizien were accompanied by a paramilitary unit of Ukrainian nationalists under Włodzimierz Czerniawski's command, including members of the UPA and inhabitants of local villages who intended to seize property found in the households of the murdered. According to Ukrainian historians, the massacre was committed by SS Police regiments.

The Warsaw division of the "Commission for the punishment of crimes against the Polish people" launched an investigation  in July 2001.

Background
Huta Pieniacka was a village of about 1,000 ethnically Polish inhabitants in 200 houses, located in the Tarnopol Voivodeship, Poland (today  Ternopil Oblast in Ukraine). In 1939, following joint German and Soviet attack on Poland, the voivodeship was annexed by the Soviet Union, becoming part of the Ukrainian Soviet Republic. After the 1941 German attack on the Soviet Union, it fell under German occupation.

The village was a major Polish resistance centre, fighting against German forces and the Ukrainian Insurgent Army.  As a result, the Ukrainians wanted to eliminate this Polish stronghold. Polish inhabitants of the village co-operated with Soviet partisans, active in the area. In January and February 1944, Soviet troops were frequent visitors, and this was noticed by both the Ukrainians and the Germans. An armed stronghold, Huta Pieniacka had fought off several attacks in 1943 and early 1944.

Massacre
Early in the morning of February 28, 1944, a mixed force of Ukrainian SS and German soldiers surrounded Huta Pieniacka. There were some 600–800 soldiers and it has been established that Kazimierz Wojciechowski (who was burnt alive that day), commandant of Polish forces in the village, had been informed of the approaching enemy around two hours before the attack. The Poles however, had too little time to prepare a defense or to escape.

The village was shelled by artillery. Some time around noon a mixed force of Ukrainian SS and German soldiers and a strong contingent from the SS Freiwilligen Division "Galizien" surrounded Huta Pieniacka and herded the villagers into their barns. The attackers set fire to the village and it burned all day. According to Bogusława Marcinkowska, a historian from Kraków's office of the Institute of National Remembrance, the Ukrainians threw infants against walls and cut open the stomachs of pregnant women. The murderers left at night. Many of them were drunk and singing songs. Only four houses remained, and on the next day a mass funeral took place. Those who survived escaped to Zloczow and other towns, never to return.

Witnesses interrogated by the Polish prosecutors of "The Head Commission for the Prosecution of Crimes against the Polish Nation" described the details of crimes committed against women, children and newborn babies. After murdering the inhabitants of Huta Pieniacka, the local Ukrainian population looted the remaining property of the murdered, loading everything on horse-drawn carts that had been prepared beforehand. According to those Poles who survived, the Germans did not participate in the massacre itself.

In the April 9, 2008 issue of the Gazeta Polska weekly, an article about the massacre appeared. According to those persons who survived (four of whom were cited), the murderers were Ukrainians of the SS Galizien Division. All those who recollected the massacre (Emilia Bernacka, then 10; Filomena Franczukowska, then 20; Jozefa Orlowska, then 16; and Regina Wroblewska, then 6) claimed that the village was attacked by the Ukrainian troops, who murdered all Poles they managed to catch, including infants. The mentioned persons survived because somebody managed to open the rear door of a village church in which the murderers were massacring the Polish civilians.

Filomena Franczukowska, who was 20 then and is the oldest still-living survivor of the massacre (as of April 2008) stated in the Gazeta Polska article that the Ukrainians came to the village at 4 am. They entered Huta Pieniacka from the nearby village of Zarkow and began shooting at everybody. Her father had been beaten before being executed, and one of the attackers said loudly in Ukrainian: "Now you have your Poland and your England." Franczukowska lost both parents and three younger siblings in the massacre; only her brother survived. She said that the murderers deliberately did not kill two twin boys, aged 4, and were laughing at the children who were trying to 'wake up' their dead mother. Franczukowska, together with her brother and a group of people, was ordered to go to a barn which was locked and set on fire. She somehow managed to open the rear door and escape to a forest. "Now they say they do not know who did it, but it is enough to visit neighboring Ukrainian villages, one can still see remnants of the stolen property. The locals remember this event and this is why none of them has settled in Huta Pieniacka since then," she said.

The weekly publication of the Polish Home Army – the Biuletyn Ziemi Czerwienskiej (Land of Czerwien Bulletin) for March 26, 1944 (№ 12) [216, p. 8] stated that during the Battle at Pidkamin and Brody, Soviet forces took a couple of hundred soldiers of the SS Galizien division prisoner. All were immediately shot in the Zbarazh castle on the basis that two weeks earlier they had apparently taken part in the killing of the Polish inhabitants of Huta Pienacka, and as a result could not be categorized as prisoners of war.

Investigation
The Warsaw branch of the Polish Institute of National Remembrance (IPN) started an investigation into the massacre in November 1992. The investigation was subsequently suspended between 1997 and 2001, and as of 2008 is being conducted by the Kraków branch of the Institute.

The Institute of History of the Ukrainian Academy of Sciences investigated the events at Huta Pienicka and concluded that the 4th and 5th SS Police regiments did indeed kill the civilians within the village. It noted that at the time of the massacre the police regiments were not under 14th division command but rather under German police command (specifically, under German Sicherheitsdienst and SS command of the General Government). During this time, these units enjoyed a close relationship with local UPA units.

Aftermath
After the massacre, some local AK commanders forbade Polish strongholds from sheltering Soviet partisans in order to minimize the risk of those self-defence posts' destruction.

In the late 1940s, some 8,000 soldiers of the SS Galizien division were allowed to come to Britain, allegedly including members of the unit that massacred inhabitants of Huta Pieniacka. Most of them were not questioned about their activities, and successive British governments refused requests by lobby groups as well as American authorities to investigate their backgrounds. However, a 2001 television documentary, The SS in Britain, initiated a police investigation after uncovering evidence suggesting that former members of the SS Galizien division living in Britain had participated in massacres in Poland.

The documentary, however, made numerous factual mistakes. The statement that the 4th and 5th regiments of the SS Galizien Division took part in the massacre was inaccurate, as the division had at that time been normalized to 3 regiments; there were no 4th or 5th regiments. The division also was at that time still in the process of formation, which was completed two months later in May 1944 near the Polish town of Dębica.

Recent events

On February 28, 1989 a memorial was built on the site of the previous village, but was soon destroyed. A new monument commemorating the victims was erected in 2005 and unveiled on October 21, 2005. During the unveiling the consul put the blame of the massacre on the Ukrainians in his speech, stating, "On 28 February 1944, when the 'SS Galizien' together with other Ukrainian nationalists did horrible things as told by a contemporary, they shot mothers, children and murdered..."

Ukraine sent a note of protest regarding the fact that the Polish consul had ignored the Ukrainian government completely when opening the monument, that the new monument did not adhere to "Ukrainian laws" and was erected without the "necessary permits".

As a result of actions by the parliamentarian Oleh Tyahnybok, a note of protest regarding the "illegal erection" of the monument was sent out and the Polish consul was declared a persona non-grata for "degrading the national dignity of the Ukrainian people".

On February 28, 2007 a new monument was unveiled to the Poles who had been killed in the atrocities at Huta Peniacka. A delegation from Poland led by the vice consul of Culture for the Polish consulate in Lviv, Marcin Zieniewicz, stated that the occasion marked one of the most tragic pages in the history of not only the Polish people, but also of the Ukrainian people. On February 28, 2009 the presidents of Ukraine and Poland met at the monument to commemorate the massacre.

The village of Huta Pieniacka no longer exists. Most of the houses were burned during the massacre and only the school and a Roman Catholic church remained. Both of these buildings were demolished after the war, and in the area of the village there is a pasture for cattle. There is a post with a Ukrainian inscription Center of the former village, but it does not mention the name of the village.

January 2017: Monument to Polish WWII massacre victims desecrated with fascist symbols in Ukraine. A cross made of stone was blown up, while two tables with the names of the Poles killed in the 1944 massacre were damaged. The Polish Foreign Ministry has condemned the attack on the monument. In a statement published on its website, it called for an "immediate" investigation, saying those behind it must be punished. Incidents like this threaten relations between the two nations, the statement added. The monument was rebuilt on behalf of local Ukrainian community and unveiled on February 26, 2017.

See also
 List of massacres in Ukraine
 Historiography of the Volyn tragedy
 Massacres of Poles in Volhynia
 Chodaczkow Wielki massacre
 Pidkamin massacre

Citations

References

 Per Anders Rudling, They Defended Ukraine’: The 14. Waffen-Grenadier-Division der SS (Galizische Nr. 1) Revisited, The Journal of Slavic Military Studies, 25:3, 329–368 online version
 Investigation of the Crime Committed at the Village of Huta Pieniacka  – Institute of National Remembrance 
List of 125 victims by Stanisław Kowalski
  Bogusława Marcinkowska Ustalenia wynikające ze śledztwa w sprawie zbrodni ludobójstwa funkcjonariuszy SS "GALIZIEN" i nacjonalistów ukraińskich na Polakach w Hucie Pieniackiej 28 lutego 1944 roku. – Institute of National Remembrance 
   Ihor Ilyushyn. Tragedy of Volynia 1943–1944. Kiev: Institute History of National Academy of Sciences of Ukraine, 2003. – 312 s. Available online in www.archives.gov.ua
 Ihor Holog. Newspaper "Moloda Halychyna" July 15, 2004 
 Statement brotherhood warrior of OUN-UPA 
 Newspaper "Ukrayinske slovo" 
 "Opowiesc o zamordowanej wiosce" ("Story of a murdered village"), article by Wojciech Orlowski, published on April 9, 2008 in Gazeta Polska weekly 
  

1944 in Poland
Mass murder in 1944
Massacres in 1944
World War II massacres
Poland in World War II
World War II crimes in Poland
Massacres of Poles in Eastern Galicia
February 1944 events